Repercussion of bomb throwing incident in Lok Sabha Chamber, the then Central Legislative Assembly on 8 April 1929, The then President of Central Legislative Assembly, Shri Vithalbhai Patel, (24 August 1925 – April 1930) set up a ‘WATCH AND WARD COMMITTEE’ on 3 September 1929.
Sir James Crerar, Chairman of the Committee recommended the establishment of  ‘Door – Keeper & Messengers’. Initially 21 men were nominated for access control in the complex. The Sergeant at Arms (COLIN KEPPEL) was designated as Controller and another 25 officials drawn from the Delhi Police, the then Metropolitan Police, for deployment in Gallery and a Watch & Ward Officer was appointed to administer the directions of the Hon’ble Speaker under the guidance of the Secretary General. The Watch & Ward has been renamed as Parliament Security Service since15 April 2009.

The Parliament Security Service headed by Joint Secretary (Security), looks after the security set up in the Indian Parliament House complex. Director (Security) of the Rajya Sabha Secretariat exercises security operational control over the Parliament Security Service in the Rajya Sabha sector under the administrative control of the Rajya Sabha Secretariat. Director (Security) of the Lok Sabha Secretariat exercises security operational control over the Parliament Security Service in the Lok Sabha sector under the administrative control of the Lok Sabha Secretariat. Parliament Security Service is the In-House system to provides proactive, preventive and protective security to the VIPs/VVIPs, building and its incumbents. Parliament Security Services is solely responsible for management of access control and regulation of people, material and vehicles within the historical and prestigious Parliament House Complex.

Being the In-House security service its prime approach revolves around the principles of Access Control, based on proper authorization, verification, identification and authentication of human and material resources entering the Parliament House Complex with the help of modern security gadgets. Since the threat perception has been increasing over the years due to manifold growth of various terrorist organizations/ outfits, refinement in their planning, intelligence, actions and surrogated war-fare tactics employed by organizations sponsoring and nourishing terrorists, new security procedures have been introduced into the security management to counter the ever-changing modus operandi of terrorist outfits/individuals posing threat to the Parliament House Complex and its VIPs.

The Parliament Security Services is the nodal security organization responsible for security of Parliament House Complex and the objective is ensured by coordinating with various other security agencies.

Other security agencies viz. Delhi Police, Parliament Duty Group/Central Reserve Police Force, Delhi Fire Service, Intelligence Bureau, SPG and NSG assist Parliament Security Service.

Having expertise in identification of Hon'ble Members Of Parliament, the departments/institutions call on PSS Officers for assistance to identify during VVIP functions and therefore Parliament Security Service also assist President House during oath ceremony & At-Home functions, Army & Delhi Police during Republic Day (26 January) function on Rajpath and on Independence Day (15 August) functions organized at Red Fort every year.

The Parliament Security Service plays an important operational activity during the Presidential election. It also coordinates between the Bureau of Civil Aviation Security, the Delhi Police, Airport Security for the collection of the ballot boxes, containing ballot papers of respective state legislature, from the Airport, its safe transportation under armed guards from Airport to Parliament House where it is placed in safe custody under the aegis of the Returning Officer under lock and key under the protection of round the clock armed guards After the completion of the counting and declaration of the result, the ballot boxes are duly returned to the Election Commission.

One of the important operational activities of the Parliament Security Service is the show around of the Parliament House Complex to the visitors coming to see the Parliament House during inter-session period. The Sub Officers of the Parliament Security Service are deputed to ensure that the visitors, foreign dignitaries and the delegations are escorted properly and given factual and detailed information about the history of the Parliament, its building and the procedures practiced for conducting the proceedings of the Parliament. For the students, it is designed more or less on the pattern of an educational tour. Visitors are also given a brief about the statues and portraits installed in the complex.

References

Parliament of India
Parliament police services